The Transporter (French: Le Transporteur) is a 2002 French English-language action-thriller film directed by Cory Yuen from a screenplay by Luc Besson and Robert Mark Kamen. It is the first installment in the Transporter franchise and stars Jason Statham as Frank Martin, alongside Shu Qi, François Berléand, Matt Schulze, and Ric Young. In the film, Frank, a British mercenary driver living in France, finds himself involved in a people smuggling plot.

The Transporter inspired was by the short film series The Hire. 

The Transporter premiered at the Regency Village Theatre in Los Angeles on 2 October 2002 and was first theatrically released in the United States on 11 October by 20th Century Fox, and in France on 23 October by EuropaCorp. It received mixed reviews from critics, with praise for its action sequences but criticism for its story. It grossed $43.9 million worldwide and was followed by the sequel Transporter 2 (2005).

Plot 
Frank Martin is a former special operations soldier and now highly skilled driver/mercenary residing in southern France whose callsign is The Transporter. He strictly follows three rigid rules when transporting:

Never change the deal.
No names.
Never open the package.

In Nice, Frank is hired to transport three bank robbers with his black BMW 735i, but they hoist a fourth man in his car after the robbery. Explaining the extra weight will affect his precisely planned getaway, he refuses to drive until, in desperation, the leader kills one of his men who is pushed out of the car. Later they offer more money for Frank to drive them to Avignon. He refuses the deal. The robbers escape in another car, but are foiled by their amateur driving. At Frank's villa on the French Riviera, local Police Inspector Tarconi questions Frank about the black BMW that fled the scene of the robbery which Frank was the getaway driver.

Lacking any real proof, Tarconi leaves. The package is loaded into Frank's trunk. While changing a flat tire, Frank notices the package moving. Realizing a person is inside, he violates his third rule in order to give the person something to drink. He discovers a woman, tied up and gagged. She attempts to escape but Frank recaptures her and returns her to the trunk along with two policemen who spot them. Frank delivers the package to Wall Street as promised and agrees to another job, transporting a briefcase. As Frank stops to buy drinks for the cops in his trunk, a bomb hidden in the briefcase explodes.

Out for vengeance, Frank returns to Wall Street's villa where he kills and wounds several henchmen. Frank then steals a car (a Mercedes-Benz S-Klasse) to get away, only to find "the package" bound and gagged in the back seat. He brings the young woman, whose name is Lai, back to his house. Wall Street visits one of his surviving men in hospital in order to determine who attacked his residence, before killing the man after discovering that Frank is alive. The next day, Tarconi arrives and asks about Frank's car, which Frank claims was stolen. Lai supports Frank's alibi by introducing herself as his new cook and girlfriend. Tarconi again leaves with no concrete evidence. Shortly after, Wall Street's hitmen fire missiles and automatic weapons down on the house.

Frank and Lai barely escape through an underwater passage to a nearby safe house. Later, while being questioned at the police station, Lai accesses Tarconi's computer to find information on Wall Street. Frank, presumed dead by Wall Street, wants to rebuild his villa and start a new life and advises Lai to do so too before she tells him that Wall Street is a human trafficker with 400 Chinese trapped in shipping containers,  including her family. Lai and Frank go to Wall Street's office, where Wall Street reveals that Lai's father, Mr. Kwai, is also a human trafficker and Wall Street's partner in crime. Kwai arrives and his henchmen subdue Frank. When Tarconi arrives, Kwai and Wall Street accuse Frank of kidnapping Lai.

Tarconi has Frank arrested and locked up in the station. Realizing that Frank would not be constrained by search warrants and that he would be able to solve the case faster than the police, Tarconi agrees to aid Frank's escape as his faux hostage and releases him at the harbour of Cassis. Frank then tracks the criminals to the docks in Marseille, where they load the containers onto trucks. However, Frank is spotted and forced to fight his way through the guards, and fails to stop the trucks. He then steals an old car and makes chase at dawn before it breaks down on a small country road. He then commandeers a small airplane from a farmer and follows the highway to the trucks where he parachutes onto one of them.

After a lengthy fight, Frank manages to kill Wall Street by throwing him out of the moving truck where he is crushed by the wheels (in the American version, Wall Street is simply thrown out of the truck to be arrested), only to be ambushed by Kwai once he gets out of the truck where he is marched to a cliff edge. Frank is prepared to fight back until Lai reluctantly shoots her father. Afterwards, Tarconi arrives with the police, and they rescue the people trapped inside the two containers as he congratulates Frank on his work.

Cast 
 Jason Statham as Frank Martin
 Shu Qi as Lai Kwai
 François Berléand as Inspector Tarconi
 Matt Schulze as Darren "Wall Street" Bettencourt
 Ric Young as Mr. Kwai

Releases

Theatrical release 
The Transporter premiered in 2,573 theaters. With a production budget of $20.5 million, it grossed $25,296,447 in the United States and a total of $43,928,932 worldwide.

Cut and uncut releases 
The film was cut to receive a PG-13 rating in the United States, and this version was also released in the United Kingdom and several other countries. Japan and France received the uncut versions. Certain sequences of violence were either cut or toned down for the PG-13 cut. These include:
 The fight on the bus, which included Frank using a knife and knee.
 The final fight on the highway, where Frank fights Wall Street in the truck. In the original French version, Wall Street is crushed beneath the wheels of the truck after Frank throws him from it. In the US PG-13 version, he is simply thrown out of the truck and onto the highway.
The uncut fight on the bus can be seen in the "Extended Fight Sequences" on the North American DVD, but with no sound.

The Japanese region-free Blu-ray cut of this film has the original uncut French version of the film. It also has several special features and deleted scenes. However, it does not include the North American special feature of the uncut fight scenes (with no sound). The uncut version of Transporter 2 is also included in this special boxed set.

Soundtrack

Original Soundtrack
 Tweet – "Boogie 2Nite"
 Nate Dogg – "I Got Love"                                                                                                               
 Sacario featuring Angie Martinez and Fat Joe – "Live Big (Remix)"†                                                                                                                                 
 "Benzino – Rock The Party"†
 Knoc-Turn'al – "Muzik"
 Angie Martinez featuring Lil' Mo and Sacario – "If I Could Go!"†
 Tamia – "Be Alright"†
 Missy Elliott – "Scream AKA Itchin'
 Gerald Levert – "Funny"†
 Hustlechild – "I'm Cool"†
 Keith Sweat – "One on One"†
 Nadia – "Life of a Stranger"
† indicates that the song did not appear in the film

Original Motion Picture Score
The original score were composed by Stanley Clarke and The Replicant (for "Love Rescue" and "Transfighter").

 Stanley Clarke – Mission
 Stanley Clarke – Serenity
 Stanley Clarke – Franck Tries to Leave
 The Replicant – Transfighter
 DJ Pone & Drixxxé – Fighting Man
 The Replicant – Love Rescue
 DJ Pone & Drixxxé – Rockin' and Scratchin'
 Stanley Clarke – Interrogation with Inspector
 Stanley Clarke – Gives Package a Drink
 DJ Pone & Drixxxé – The Chase
 Stanley Clarke – It's All Over
 Stanley Clarke – Laï Snoops Around

Home media 
The DVD version was released on 23 October 2003. It included fifteen minutes of extended fight scene footage and a feature-length commentary. On 23 August 2005, the film was released again in a "Special Delivery Edition". This version included all the features of the original release plus a new behind-the-scenes documentary, a making-of featurette, and a storyboard-to-film comparison. The film was also released as a part of "The Transporter Collection", which featured the first two films in the series. A Blu-ray format was released on 14 November 2006.

Reception 
Review aggregation website Rotten Tomatoes gives the film a score of 54% based on reviews from 127 critics and an average rating of 5.6 out of 10. The site's consensus reads: "The Transporter delivers the action at the expense of coherent storytelling." At Metacritic, which assigns a weighted average score out of 100 to reviews from mainstream critics, the film received an average score of 51 based on 27 reviews, indicating "mixed or average reviews". Audiences polled by CinemaScore gave the film an average grade of "B+" on an A+ to F scale.

Manohla Dargis, of the Los Angeles Times, complimented the action, saying, "[Statham] certainly seems equipped to develop into a mid-weight alternative to Vin Diesel. That's particularly true if he keeps working with director Corey Yuen, a Hong Kong action veteran whose talent for hand-to-hand mayhem is truly something to see."

Roger Ebert wrote, "Too much action brings the movie to a dead standstill." Eric Harrison, of the Houston Chronicle, said, "It's junk with a capital J. The sooner you realize that, the more quickly you can settle down to enjoying it."

" . . . Frank breaks one of his own rules and opens the package. What follows is a high octane action movie. Slowly we learn about Frank’s past and the skills that make him such a fantastic driver. Those skills put him in a unique position to rescue not only the package he was transporting but a cargo container full of people.
Beautiful scenery, a clear hero, well-choreographed action sequences, and enough character development to keep you engaged, make The Transporter a great excuse for a bowl of popcorn."

Notes

References

External links 
 Official Website
 
 
 

2002 films
2002 action thriller films
2000s crime thriller films
20th Century Fox films
2000s chase films
EuropaCorp films
Films scored by Stanley Clarke
Films about kidnapping
Films about automobiles
Films about human trafficking
Films about organized crime in France
French films about revenge
Films directed by Corey Yuen
Films directed by Louis Leterrier
Films produced by Luc Besson
Films set in France
Films set on the French Riviera
Films shot in Saint-Tropez
French action thriller films
Patricide in fiction
Films with screenplays by Luc Besson
Films with screenplays by Robert Mark Kamen
Transporter (franchise)
English-language French films
2002 directorial debut films
2000s English-language films
2000s French films